Stacey Ball (born November 25, 1973) is a Canadian former pair skater.  With partner Jean-Michel Bombardier, she won the bronze medal at the 1991 Canadian Figure Skating Championships.

References

1973 births
Canadian female pair skaters
Living people
Place of birth missing (living people)